Marlene Lewis (born 4 October 1962) is a Jamaican athlete. She competed in the women's discus throw at the 1984 Summer Olympics.

References

1962 births
Living people
Athletes (track and field) at the 1984 Summer Olympics
Jamaican female discus throwers
Olympic athletes of Jamaica
Place of birth missing (living people)